List of hospitals in Suriname include:
 Academic Hospital Paramaribo, Paramaribo
 Diakonessenhuis (Paramaribo), Paramaribo
 Mungra Medical Centre, Nieuw Nickerie
 's Lands Hospitaal, Paramaribo
 Regional Hospital Wanica, Lelydorp
 Sint Vincentius Hospital, Paramaribo

References

List
Suriname
Hospitals
Suriname